Airmax or Air Max may refer to:

 Nike Air Max, a line of shoes first released by Nike, Inc.
 AirMax, a proprietary wireless protocol and wireless product brand developed by Ubiquiti Networks
 Air Max Africa, an airline based in Libreville, Gabon
 AirMax SeaMax, a Brazilian single-engine, amphibious light sport aircraft

See also
 Airmax Muzik II, 6th studio album by German rapper Fler